Mykhailo Gerasimovych Ilienko (born June 29, 1947, in Moscow) is a Ukrainian film director, screenwriter, and actor. He is an Academician of the National Academy of Arts of Ukraine (2017), an Honored Artist of Ukraine (2003), and a Laureate of the Oleksandr Dovzhenko State Prize of Ukraine (2007).

References 

Living people
1947 births
Ukrainian screenwriters
Soviet male film actors
Ukrainian male actors
Gerasimov Institute of Cinematography alumni